Emilie Miller (9 March 1995) is an Australian Paralympic road hand cyclist and wheelchair rugby player.

Personal
Miller was born on 9 March 1995.  As a 12 year old at Kinross Wolaroi School, Orange, New South Wales, she  was training at Lithgow War Memorial Swimming Pool for the NSW State Age Championships when she slipped during a dive in the shallow end of the pool and the accident left her a quadriplegic.  She lost a High Court of Australia appeal for compensation for her life-altering injuries that occurred as a result of the  accident. In 2019, she lives and trains in Bathurst, New South Wales.

Cycling
Miller was ranked in the top 20 Australian girl swimmers for her age when a diving accident during training in 2008 left her a quadriplegic. She took up hand cycling at the age of 17 as cross training for another sport. Her first Australian Road Cycling Championships were in 2013 and as of 2019 is undefeated in H1 events. 

At the 2018 UCI Para-cycling Road World Championships in Italy, she won gold medals in Women's Time Trial H1 and Women's Road race H1. She repeated these medals at the 2019 UCI Para-cycling Road World Championships in Netherlands. 

She is coached in Bathurst by former world junior cyclist Toireasa Gallagher (née Ryan).

Wheelchair rugby
Miller clasified as 0.5 player, won her first world championship gold medal at the 2022 IWRF World Championship in Vejle, Denmark, when Australia defeated the United States . 

|medaltemplates =

External links
Australian Cycling Team Profile

References

Living people
1995 births
Australian female cyclists
Cyclists from New South Wales
Paralympic cyclists of Australia
Australian wheelchair rugby players